The Royal Galician Football Federation (RFGF) is the governing body of the sport of football in Galicia, Spain.

The RFGF organises Group 1 of the Tercera División, with the assistance of the Royal Spanish Football Federation (RFEF), as part of the Spanish football league system. It also organises the Copa Galiza and regional divisions of Galicia independently from the Royal Spanish Football Federation.

The RFGF, which also administered the Championship of Galicia (a regional league competition whose best teams qualified for the Copa del Rey) until the end of the 1930s, was founded in 1909 and is based in A Coruña.

Competitions
 Copa Xunta
 Tercera División (Group 1)
 Preferente Autonómica
 Primeira Autonómica
 Segunda Autonómica
 Terceira Autonómica

See also
 Galicia national football team
 Spanish football league system

External links
 Official website 

Galicia
Football in Galicia (Spain)
Sports organizations established in 1909
1909 establishments in Spain
Organisations based in Spain with royal patronage